The Indian Claims Commission was a judicial relations arbiter between the United States federal government and Native American tribes. It was established under the Indian Claims Act of 1946 by the United States Congress to hear any longstanding claims of Indian tribes against the United States. It took until the late 1970s to complete most of them, with the last case finished in the early 21st century.

The commission was conceived as way to thank Native Americans for their unprecedented service in World War II and as a way to relieve the anxiety and resentment caused by the United States' history of colonization of indigenous peoples. Together with the law, the Commission created a process for tribes to address their grievances against the United States, and offered monetary compensation for territory lost as a result of broken federal treaties. However, by accepting the government's monetary offer, the aggrieved tribe abdicated any right to raise their claim again in the future. On occasion, a tribe gave up federal recognition as part of the settlement of a claim. 

Anthropologists and ethnologists, historians and legalists, as well as government officials including lawyers, were the dominant researchers, advocates, and legal counsel for the plaintiff tribes and the defendant federal government. The greatly expanded amount of anthropological research conducted for the Commission led to the foundation of the American Society for Ethnohistory (ASE). The research and historical reports compiled in evidence for Native American claims was first amassed in 1954 at the inaugural Ohio Valley Historic Indian Conference, the predecessor organization later renamed the ASE. A collection of the studies was published in the series "American Indian Ethnohistory" by Garland Publishing in 1974. The methodology and theory of ethnohistorical research in general traces back to the work done by anthropologists and other scholars on claims before the Commission.

With the chance to pursue claims against the government, many neglected Indian groups in the Southeast, the Northeast, and California organized tribal governments in order to pursue their claims, particularly for land. In particular, the 1946 act allowed any "identifiable" group of native descendants to bring a cause of action without regard to their federal recognition status. Tribes such as the Poarch Band of Creek Indians of Alabama trace their modern federal status to the efforts of Chief Calvin McGhee and his 1950s work with the Indian Claims Commission. Indian land claims were one of the key reasons the Bureau of Indian Affairs established its administrative Federal Acknowledgment Process in 1978. 
   
The Commission was adjourned in 1978 by Public Law 94-465, which terminated the Commission and transferred its pending docket of 170 cases to the United States Court of Claims on September 30, 1978. By the time of the Commission's final report, it had awarded $818,172,606.64 in judgments and had completed 546 dockets.

Land claims 

Land was the dominant concern of the litigation by tribes before the Indian Claims Commission (ICC). The statutory authority did not permit this tribunal to grant or restore land to the tribes, but only to award money based upon a net acreage figure of lost lands times the monetary market value of an acre at the time of taking. This limitation on the authority of the ICC was resented by many tribal peoples, who wanted the return of their lands more than money—e.g., the Pit River Indians of northern California, and the Teton and Lakota of the Black Hills, South Dakota. In a few instances, by way of settlement acts, tribes gained some monetary funds to buy acreage when they had no communal land (as with the Penobscot and Passamaquoddy of Maine and the Catawba of the Carolinas). Special congressional acts on occasion did restore some acreage, as with the Havasupai at the Grand Canyon.

In preparing expert testimony for litigation brought by the tribes as plaintiffs or for the defense by the U.S. government, researchers explored all forms of data, including the earliest possible maps of original title—i.e., native or indigenous—territory and the cartographic presentations based upon treaties, statutes, and executive orders—generally identified as recognized title. In most cases, recognized title lands could be more easily demonstrated in litigation, while native territory depended upon Indian informants, explorers, trappers, military personnel, missionaries and early field ethnographers. Scholars sought to reconstruct native ecology  in terms of food supply and other resources of the environment. In this way, some concept of original territory could be gained that could be mapped. As the Final Report of the ICC revealed, compromises over territorial parcels led to rejecting some acreage which had been used by more than one tribe over time.

The briefs, testimonies, quantum data, findings, and decisions were published in the 1970s in a multiple series of microfiche by Clearwater Publishing, Co., NY, which publisher was sold to CIS, then to Nexis/Lexis. Garland Publishing, NY, also in the 1970s, published some two hundred books containing some but not all of the materials pertaining to the claims cases.

See also
 Checkerboarding (land)
 Off-reservation trust land
 Land Buy-Back Program for Tribal Nations
 Diminishment

Notes

References 
Ward Churchill, "Charades, Anyone? The Indian Claims Commission in Context," 24 American Indian Culture & Research Journal 43 (2000).
Richard Hughes, "Can the Trustee Be Sued for Its Breach? The Sad Saga of United States v. Mitchell," 26 S.D. L. Rev. 447 (1981).
Harvey D. Rosenthal, Their Day in Court:  A History of the Indian Claims Commission (1990).  .
Nancy Shoemaker, Clearing a Path: Theorizing the Past in Native American Studies (2002).  .
E.B. Smith, Indian Tribal Claims: Decided in the Court of Claims of the United States, Briefed and Compiled to June 30, 1947 (1976).
Imre Sutton (ed.), Irredeemable America: The Indians’ Estate and Land Claims ( 1985).
John F. Martin, From Judgment to Land Restoration: the Havasupai Claims Case.
Imre Sutton, "Land Claims," in Native America in the Twentieth Century, An Encyclopedia, pp. 303-10 (Mary B. Davis ed., 1994) (NY: Garland Publishing Co.)
Imre Sutton (ed.), The Continuing Saga of Indian Land Claims symposium, 24 Am. Indian Culture & Res. J. 120 (2000).
Glen A. Wilkinson, "Indian Tribal Claims Before the Court of Claims," 55 Geo. L.J. 511 (1966).
Mark Edwin Miller, Forgotten Tribes: Unrecognized Indians and the Federal Acknowledgment Process (2004).

External links 
 -Final map: "Indian Land Areas Judicially Established, 1978, online edition.
Wilkinson, Cragun, and Barker Papers. MSS 2382; 20th century Western & Mormon Manuscripts collection; L. Tom Perry Special Collections, Harold B. Lee Library, Brigham Young University.
Indian Claims Commissions Collection at Oklahoma State University

United States federal Indian policy
United States federal boards, commissions, and committees
Native American law
Aboriginal title in the United States
Federal sovereign immunity in the United States